Brig railway station is an important railway junction in the municipality of Brig-Glis (French: Brigue-Glis), in the Canton of Valais, Switzerland. Opened in 1878, it is adjacent to the northern portal of the Simplon Tunnel and is served by two standard gauge lines. Another two metre gauge lines serve the physically adjacent Brig Bahnhofplatz railway station.

History

Service to Brig began on 18 June 1878; it was at that time the eastern terminus of the Simplon Railway. The opening of the Simplon Tunnel in 1906 extended the Simplon Railway southeast to Domodossola, in Italy.

Brig's other standard gauge line, the Lötschberg railway line, opened in 1913. It links Bern with Brig via the Lötschberg Pass, including the Lötschberg Tunnel. In 2007, this line was largely supplanted by the New Railway Link through the Alps (NRLA), connecting (Bern and) Spiez with Visp, near Brig, via the Lötschberg Base Tunnel. Trains travelling along the NRLA line to Visp usually then continue on to Brig via the Simplon line.

Services
The following services stop at Brig:

 EuroCity/InterCity: trains every two hours to Basel SBB; EuroCity trains continue from Brig to  via .
 InterRegio:
 three trains per day to Domodossola.

See also

History of rail transport in Switzerland
Rail transport in Switzerland

References

Notes

Further reading

External links

 Swiss Federal Railways
 
 Interactive station plan (Brig)
 BLS AG 
 Official timetable of Switzerland

Railway stations in Switzerland opened in 1878
Railway stations in the canton of Valais
Swiss Federal Railways stations
Brig-Glis